The Sons of Poland  is a Polish-American fraternal benefit society which was organized in 1903. In addition to selling life insurance to members, it supports charities in the United States and Poland as well as activities in the Polish-American community in New Jersey and New York.

History
The Association of the Sons of Poland was established in 1903 as a Fraternal Benefit Society. At the onset of existence the Association's goals were to provide benefits for Polish-American families and send financial help to their relatives in Poland. The Association grew both in membership and financial stability becoming a leader in upholding the traditions of Polish Heritage and patriotism as well as continuing an active contact with Poland. During the first World War while Russia and Germany were systematically destroying Poland, the Delegates to the Quadrennial Convention voted to tax each member 2¢ each month to be sent to feed hungry war victims in Poland. In the 1930s, large sums of money were sent to assist flood victims in southern Poland followed by tremendous donations to assist the poor in Polish cities. Just prior to World War Two, the Association was recognized for being the most active organization in the Polish-American Community and was decorated by the Second Republic of Poland with the coveted Złoty Medal Zasługi (Gold Medal of Service). The Association continued assisting Poland during her most devastating years of war.

Today the Association of the Sons of Poland is the only Polish American Fraternal domiciled in New Jersey. It supports Polish language courses and organizations that promote Polish Culture and Heritage, such as the Polish Singers Alliance of America and an exhibit of art at Seton Hall University. It continues to sponsor the Polish Children’s Heartline and the Polish Gift of Life, charities that provide medical care for Polish children. The Association was directly involved in the establishment of the Polish-American Congress and Pulaski Memorial Parade Committee, both of which still receive support. Major Foundations like the Kosciuszko Foundation and the Polish Cultural Foundation also receive support. It also gives financial and material support to Polish Orphans, mentally and physically disabled children, the homeless and un-wed mothers both in Poland and the United States through the Sons of Poland Benevolent Foundation, a 501(c)(3) charity.

Organization 
Local units are referred to as "Lodges/Groups". Twenty persons who apply for membership may establish their own group however, a minimum of fifty members of the lodge/group is required to send a Delegate to the Convention. The highest national structure is the Supreme Convention, which meets quadrennially. The headquarters of the group is located at 333 Hackensack Street, Carlstadt, New Jersey  07072, while the organization was originally established in Jersey City.

Membership 
Membership is through the purchase of life insurance with the minimum amount at $2,000 up to a maximum of $20,000, as a non-medical limit but with an exam, the maximum coverage is $50,000. Benefits of insured membership include a subscription to the monthly Polish American Journal; Scholarships and Achievement awards for High School Seniors; prescription cards that can offer up to a 30% discount on prescription medications for members and even their guests from Poland or any other country; LifeLine Screenings to detect a possible tendency for stroke or aneurisms; group health care discounts that includes a dental/vision plan, and a choice of wellness plans from a health mart and accidental death/dismemberment insurance.

References

External links
Official website

Ethnic fraternal orders in the United States
Polish-American organizations
Polish-American culture
Organizations established in 1903